

Trumhere (or Thumhere; died ) was a medieval Bishop of Mercia.

Trumhere probably was consecrated about 658 and died about 662. He was born in England but was educated in Ireland. He was the first abbot of Gilling Abbey, which had been founded on land donated by King Oswiu of Northumbria as penance for the death of King Oswine of Deira. Trumhere was related to both Oswine and Queen Eanfled, wife of Oswiu and who was the actual founder of the monastery. When Trumhere was elected as a bishop, he was consecrated by a Celtic bishop.

Citations

References

External links
 

660s deaths
7th-century English bishops
Anglo-Saxon bishops of Lichfield
Year of birth unknown